In 1970, Hughes Aircraft Company (HAC) Space and Communications Group offered the first standardized satellite: the HS 333 design. A spinning satellite, it was based on previous one-design satellites like Intelsat I.  HAC built eight of these 300 watt, 12 channel single antenna satellites between 1970 and 1977.

Design
The early satellites were designed with cylindrical bodies to maximize the size of the satellite that could fit inside of the rocket's nose cone or fairing which was also round. The early design satellites also relied on spinning at about 30 rpm for stability in orbit. The spinning satellite is a gyroscope.

Several parallel decks, including the top and bottom, were used to mount the propulsion, attitude control, communication, Telemetry & Command (T&C), and power equipment. The upper deck or top of the satellite contained the payload antenna and the T&C antenna.

The outer surface of the cylindrical body was covered with solar cells to generate power for operating the satellite's electrical equipment. Batteries provide power during an eclipse when the satellite is in the shadow of the earth. The batteries are recharged by excess power from the solar array.

The HS 333 was 1.8 m (6 ft) in diameter and nominally 3.3 m (11 ft) high. The solar array and batteries provided sufficient power over the satellite's 7-year design life to power the 190 W payload and 233 W spacecraft equipment. The payload contributed 54 kg (119 lb) of the HS 333's 146 kg (542 lb) dry mass.

Satellites
Eight HS-333 satellites were launched:

References

See also
 Comparison of satellite buses

Satellite buses